Mary Evelyn Lentaigne (born 6 May 1920) is a British former medical artist and Red Cross Voluntary Aid Detachment nurse who worked at the Queen Victoria Hospital, England, during the Second World War. She is known for the drawings she made there of the surgical procedures of New Zealand plastic surgeon Archibald McIndoe who was working on injured servicemen. Around 300 of her drawings are held by the East Grinstead Museum where they form the Mollie Lentaigne Collection.

Early life and family
Lentaigne was born on 6 May 1920 to Lt. Col. Edward Charles Lentaigne DSO and Cecilia Mary Lentaigne in Simla, British India. Her brother, second lieutenant John Wilfred O'Neill Lentaigne MC of the Rifle Brigade, died in 1942 at El Alamein. In 1955, she married Timothy Ingram Lock. They had four sons and two daughters.

Lentaigne came from a family with several distinguished medical ancestors. These include her grandfather, Sir John Vincent Lentaigne (1855–1915), who was an Irish surgeon and president of the Royal College of Surgeons in Ireland between 1908 and 1910. Sir John was himself the grandson of the surgeon Benjamin Lentaigne who was born in France in 1773, but, as a Royalist and firm supporter of  King Louis XVI, was forced to escape to England at the age of nineteen. He went on to earn a medical qualification in England and join the British Army. He was posted to the Dublin barracks in 1775, and was involved in the treatment of Wolfe Tone, the leader of the 1798 Irish Rebellion, during his imprisonment and the final days of his life.

Second World War
During the Second World War, Lentaigne worked as a Red Cross Voluntary Aid Detachment nurse at the Queen Victoria Hospital, East Grinstead, West Sussex, where her duties included drawing the experimental operations of Archibald McIndoe and his fellow surgeons. She needed to work quickly in the operating theatre and so used pencil but subsequently added ink and colour to some of her work.

Her drawings have uncovered material on the Guinea Pig Club, a club formed of Archibald McIndoe's surgical patients, many of whom were severely burned Royal Air Force pilots and aircrew.

Legacy
Around 300 of Lentaigne's drawings have been preserved at the East Grinstead Museum, as the Mollie Lentaigne Collection. After the surviving Guinea Pig Club members used social media to search for Lentaigne and found her living in Zimbabwe, she returned to East Grinstead in 2013 to be reunited with her work.

In 2015, the Queen Victoria Hospital NHS Foundation Trust and the West Sussex Record Office were awarded a £72,952 Wellcome Trust grant for the digitisation of over 600 Guinea Pig patient files and the accompanying drawings by Mollie Lentaigne.

In 2018, Alexander Baldwin of the University of Birmingham won the Norah Schuster Prize of the Royal Society of Medicine's History of Medicine Society for an essay on the medical drawings of Mollie Lentaigne.

References

Further reading

External links
 
 Forged by Fire: Burns injury and identity in Britain, c. 1800–2000

1920 births
Living people
Archibald McIndoe
British centenarians
British military nurses
History of surgery
Mollie
Medical illustrators
Red Cross personnel
Women centenarians
British people in colonial India